The 1970 Maine gubernatorial election took place on November 3, 1970. Incumbent Democratic Governor of Maine Kenneth M. Curtis chose to seek re-election. Curtis won a landslide victory in the Democratic primary. His general election opponent was Maine Attorney General James Erwin, the Republican nominee. Erwin had also easily won his respective party primary and received the Republican nomination for governor. Curtis narrowly defeated challenger  in one of the tightest elections in Maine history – the final margin of victory was a mere 890 votes. Curtis received 163,138 votes (50.14%), while Erwin had 162,248 votes (49.86%).

Background
Although Governor Curtis kept his promise not to raise taxes, his creation of a new income tax law in 1969 caused his approval rating to fall. As a result of the new taxes, the debate about the expansion of state government became the main issue of the campaign. During his tenure, Curtis proposed gun control legislation, which would deny ownership to convicted felons, drug addicts, and those in mental institutions. This was quite controversial and  irritated gun owners throughout the state of Maine. In January 1970, Curtis strongly pledged support for an oil refinery at Machiasport. Environmentalists, as well as the Maine Times – a recently established newspaper – opposed this proposal.

Prior to announcing his re-election candidacy, Curtis commissioned a poll of himself versus potential candidate James S. Erwin, conducted by consultant Oliver Quayle. The results of the poll showed Curtis trailing Erwin by a 28% margin. Quayle told Curtis that he had "never seen an incumbent in more trouble."

Democratic primary

Candidates
Kenneth M. Curtis, incumbent Governor of Maine
Plato Truman, perennial candidate

Incumbent Governor Kenneth M. Curtis was challenged by perennial candidate Plato Truman for the Democratic nomination. Nonetheless, Curtis defeated Truman in a landslide on the day of the primary, which was June 15, 1970. Curtis received 33,052 votes (63.18%) against Truman's 19,266 votes (38.83%). Winning a majority of the votes, Curtis became the Democratic gubernatorial nominee for the state of Maine in 1970 and avoided a run-off election.

Republican primary

Candidates
James S. Erwin, Attorney General and former State Senator
Calvin Grass
In mid-February 1970, James S. Erwin, a lawyer, Maine Senator, and World War II veteran declared his candidacy for the Republican nomination. Calvin Grass also entered the race. The primary election took place on June 15, 1970. Erwin defeated Grass in a landslide, with 72,760 votes (89.18%) versus 8,898 votes (10.9%), respectively. Winning a majority of the votes, Erwin became the Republican gubernatorial nominee for the state of Maine in 1970 and avoided a run-off election.

Campaign and results
An early poll conducted by the Dorr Research Corporation in Boston showed Erwin leading Curtis 46%–39%, with 15% undecided. The first debate between Curtis and Erwin was held on September 24, 1970, which was broadcast on Maine's Education Television Network. According to most observers, Erwin appeared "awkward and not in command", while Curtis was "more poised" and "straightforward." These observers, the Maine Times, and even Erwin himself noted that Curtis won the debate. Another poll conducted by Quayle in early October still showed Erwin ahead of Curtis, despite Curtis' gain in momentum.

In the general election held on November 3, 1970, Curtis defeated James S. Erwin by a mere 890 votes. Erwin blamed the media for his loss, claiming they were biased toward Curtis. Years later, Erwin noted, "I avoided the media. I didn't like them and they didn't like me, in retrospect, I wish I had formed a more beneficial relationship with the media. I think that really hurt my campaign." Curtis' victory has also been attributed to Edmund Muskie's coattails, a popular candidate for United States Senator from Maine that year.

Recount and aftermath
Due to the very small margin of victory, a recount was almost immediately conducted. The process lasted 40 days, from November 23 to December 15, with Republicans and Democrats and their lawyers present for the recount. Eventually incumbent Governor Kenneth M. Curtis was certified as the winner and was sworn-in for a second term on January 7, 1971. He remained in office until January 2, 1975, when he was succeeded by James B. Longley. James S. Erwin received the Republican nomination for governor again in 1974, but placed third against Longley and Democrat George J. Mitchell.

See also
1962 Maine gubernatorial election

Notes

1970
Maine
Gubernatorial
November 1970 events in the United States